The men's 110 metres hurdles event at the 2004 African Championships in Athletics was held in Brazzaville, Republic of the Congo on July 14.

Medalists

Results

Heats
Wind:Heat 1: +0.1 m/s, Heat 2: -0.1 m/s

Final
Wind: +0.1 m/s

References
Results

2004 African Championships in Athletics
Sprint hurdles at the African Championships in Athletics